Mérillac is a commune in the Côtes-d'Armor department of Brittany in northwestern France.

Geography
The Meu forms part of the commune's southern border.

The Rance forms part of the commune's western border, flows east-southeast through the middle of the commune, then forms most of its southeastern border.

Population

Inhabitants of Mérillac are called mérillaciens in French.

See also
Communes of the Côtes-d'Armor department

References

External links

Communes of Côtes-d'Armor